The Berlin Journal, formerly The Berlin Evening Journal, is a weekly newspaper published in Berlin, Wisconsin. Owned by the Berlin Journal Company Inc, which  publishes five weekly newspapers in the Green Lake County, Wisconsin area, it has a circulation of approximately 4,000.

History
The newspaper began in 1870. The Journal's editor in 2001 was Robert Gonyo.

Company profile
The Berlin Journal Company Inc. estimates annual sales of $5 to 10 million and employs approximately 20 to 49 people. The company president is Tyler Gonyo.

References

Publications established in 1881
Berlin Journal
Green Lake County, Wisconsin
Waushara County, Wisconsin
Weekly newspapers published in the United States
1881 establishments in Wisconsin